Michael Leighton is an ice hockey goaltender.

Michael Leighton may also refer to:

Michael Leighton (politician) (1954–2014), Australian politician
Michael Leighton of the Leighton baronets